Fight Harm is an abandoned project by Harmony Korine filmed in 1999. The premise was to verbally provoke passers-by into a fight. The rules were Korine couldn't throw the first punch and the person confronted had to be bigger than Korine. To Korine, Fight Harm was high-comedy reminiscent of Buster Keaton. "I wanted to push humour to extreme limits to demonstrate that there's a tragic component in everything." Filmed in New York, the project was abandoned following the injuries and arrests Korine faced while shooting.

Korine shared a clip from the film on his phone at the Key West Film Festival on November 16, 2018.

References

External links
Fight Harm @ Harmony-Korine.com

1990s unfinished films
1990s English-language films
American independent films
Unreleased American films
1990s American films